Torpedo Gorky may refer to one of the following:

 Torpedo Nizhny Novgorod, an ice hockey club
 FC Torpedo NN Nizhny Novgorod, a soccer club